Vardhakya Puranam is a 1994 Indian Malayalam-language film directed by Rajasenan and written by Sasidharan Arattuvazhi. The film stars Manoj K. Jayan, Narendra Prasad, Jagathy Sreekumar, Janardhanan and Kanaka. The film featured songs composed by Kannur Rajan and film score by S. P. Venkatesh.

Plot
The film follows the adventures of three retirees. Mahendran Thambi, Ommanakuttan Pillai, and Cherian Thomas. Thambi comes up with the plan of starting a theatre troupe.

Cast

Manoj K. Jayan as Jayamohan Thampi
Narendra Prasad as Mahendran Thampi
Jagathy Sreekumar as Omanakuttan Pillai 
Janardhanan as Cherian Thomas
Kanaka as Rajani
Kanakalatha as Sumithra Omanakuttan
Meena as Susanna Cherian
Usha as Mollykutty
Kaveri as Sathi 
Prem Kumar as Parimalan - Jayan's Friend 
Philomina as Odanavattom Omana
Sudheesh as Satheesh
Abi as Santhosh
Aneesha as Thara
T. R. Omana as Mahendran Thampi's Mother
Adoor Bhavani as Thara's Grandmother
Bharath Gopi as Rajani's Father
Madhupal as Vysakhan
Oduvil Unnikrishnan as Attakulangara Ambujakshan
Indrans as Kattanam Kuttikrishnan
Sonia Baiju as Malini Thankachi
Kozhikode Narayanan Nair as Rajashekharan Thampi (Malini's Father)
Gayathri as Jayanthi (Substitute of Thara)
Appa Haja as Alexander

Soundtrack
The music was composed by Kannur Rajan.

References

External links
  
 

1994 films
1990s Malayalam-language films
Films directed by Rajasenan
Films scored by Kannur Rajan